Malankara Syrian Catholic College, Mariagiri, Tamil Nadu, India is owned and managed by the Eparchy of Marthandam of the Syro-Malankara Catholic Church, with the approval of the government of Tamil Nadu, and is affiliated to Manonmaniam Sundaranar University, Thirunelveli. It started in 1998, offering three undergraduate programmes in the disciplines of Biochemistry, Computer Science and Physics. The college was inaugurated by Moran Cyril Mar Baselios Catholicos, Major Archbishop of the Syro-Malankara Catholic Church. 

It is one of the development activities initiated by its first Bishop Lawrence Mar Ephraem. The foundation stone was blessed by Achile Cardinal Silvestrini (Prefect of the Congregation for the Oriental Churches), and laid by Msgr. Maria Arputham, (Administrator, Diocese of Marthandam), the efforts of members of Marthandam Diocese, especially Fr. Prem Kumar M.S.W., Secretary and Correspondent of the college and his team. 

The college, dedicated to 'Our Lady of Annunciation', was blessed on 20 July 1998 by Yoohanon Mar Chrysostom, the present Bishop of Marthandam Eparchy. It serves the border areas of Tamil Nadu and Kerala.

The college was accredited by the National Assessment and Accreditation Council (NAAC) with a B+ grade in 2004. The college has ISO 9001 - 2000 certification. The motto of the college is "Learn to Serve".

References

External links 
Syro-Malankara Catholic Church

Syro-Malankara Catholic Church
Catholic universities and colleges in India
Universities and colleges in Kanyakumari district
Educational institutions established in 1998
1998 establishments in Tamil Nadu
Colleges affiliated to Manonmaniam Sundaranar University